Silvia Belmar (born 2 August 1945) is a Mexican former swimmer. She competed at the 1960 Summer Olympics and the 1964 Summer Olympics.

References

External links
 

1945 births
Living people
Mexican female swimmers
Olympic swimmers of Mexico
Swimmers at the 1960 Summer Olympics
Swimmers at the 1964 Summer Olympics
Swimmers at the 1963 Pan American Games
Pan American Games competitors for Mexico
Swimmers from Mexico City
Central American and Caribbean Games gold medalists for Mexico
Central American and Caribbean Games medalists in swimming
Competitors at the 1962 Central American and Caribbean Games
21st-century Mexican women
20th-century Mexican women